The 2007–08 Argentine Primera B Nacional was the 22nd season of second division professional football in Argentina. A total of 20 teams competed; the champion and runner-up were promoted to Argentine Primera División.

Club information

Standings

Promotion/relegation playoff Legs Primera División-Primera B Nacional
The 3rd and 4th placed of the table played with the 18th and the 17th placed of the Relegation Table of 2007–08 Primera División.

|-
!colspan="5"|Relegation/promotion playoff 1

|-
!colspan="5"|Relegation/promotion playoff 2

Racing remains in Primera División by winning the playoff.
Gimnasia y Esgrima (J) remains in Primera División by winning the playoff.

Relegation

Note: Clubs with indirect affiliation with AFA are relegated to the Torneo Argentino A, while clubs directly affiliated face relegation to Primera B Metropolitana. Clubs with direct affiliation are all from Greater Buenos Aires, with the exception of Newell's, Rosario Central, Central Córdoba and Argentino de Rosario, all from Rosario, and Unión and Colón from Santa Fe.

Relegation Playoff Legs

|-
!colspan="5"|Relegation/promotion playoff 1 (Direct affiliation vs. Primera B Metropolitana)

|-
!colspan="5"|Relegation/promotion playoff 2 (Indirect affiliation vs. Torneo Argentino A)

|-
|}

 Los Andes was promoted to 2008–09 Primera B Nacional by winning the playoff and Nueva Chicago was relegated to the 2008–09 Primera B Metropolitana.
 Talleres (C) remained in the Primera B Nacional by winning the playoff.

Season statistics

Top scorers

See also
2007–08 in Argentine football

References

External links

2007–08 in Argentine football leagues
Primera B Nacional seasons